Rokdim Im Kokhavim 6 is the 6th season of the popular reality TV show Rokdim Im Kokhavim. It is hosted by Avi Kushnir and Hilla Nachshon with judges Eli Mizrahi, Claude Dadia and the Newest Hanna Laslo. This season take in guests Pamela Anderson and Emilia Attias.

Couples

Scores 

Red numbers indicate the lowest score for each week.
Green numbers indicate the highest score for each week.
 indicates the couple eliminated that week.
 indicates the returning couple that finished in the bottom two.
 indicates the winning couple.
 indicates the runner-up couple.
 indicates the third-place couple.

Averages

Dances performed 

 Highest scoring dance
 Lowest scoring dance

External links
 Official site

Channel 2 (Israeli TV channel) original programming
Season 06
2010 Israeli television seasons
2011 Israeli television seasons